Undercover with the KKK is a 1979 NBC TV movie based on the autobiography My Undercover Years with the Ku Klux Klan by Gary Thomas Rowe Jr. and starring Don Meredith as Rowe.

Premise
The film tells the true story of Gary Thomas Rowe Jr., who infiltrated the Ku Klux Klan as an undercover agent and then testified as a key witness for the prosecution during the trial of several other Klansmen.

Cast
Don Meredith as Gary Thomas Rowe Jr.
Ed Lauter as Raleigh Porter
Clifton James as Jimmy Eakin
Albert Salmi as Lester Mitchell
Michele Carey as Mary Beth Barker
Lance LeGault as Weasel
Margaret Blye as Billie Ruth Rowe
Edward Andrews as Pat Murray
Slim Pickens as Yancey Hicks
James Wainwright as T.J. Barker
Don "Red" Barry as Ben Wright
Ron Trice as Roscoe Cobb
Carl Lumbly as Reverend Lowell
Robert Stack as the Narrator

References

External links 

NBC network original films
1979 films
American biographical drama films
American crime drama films
1970s biographical films
1970s biographical drama films
Films about racism
Films directed by Barry Shear
American docudrama films
1979 television films
Films about the Ku Klux Klan
1979 crime drama films
1970s English-language films
1970s American films